Menomonee used to be a town in Waukesha County, Wisconsin, United States.

History
The town was created in December 1839 in Milwaukee County, Wisconsin Territory out of the eastern part of what had previously been the town Lisbon. On January 31, 1846, the town became part of Waukesha County. Portions of the town were incorporated as the village of Menomonee Falls in 1892, the village of Butler in 1913 and the village of Lannon in 1930 

The last remaining parts of the town were annexed by the village of Menomonee Falls in 1958.

References 

Former populated places in Wisconsin
Geography of Waukesha County, Wisconsin
1839 establishments in Wisconsin Territory